On 6 January 2022, at least six people died and 22 people became sick following gas leak from a tanker in an industrial area in Sachin, Surat, Gujarat, India.

Incident and rescue 
Around 4:25 am IST on 6 January 2022, the gas leaked from a tanker parked in Sachin GIDC, an industrial area. It was reported that the driver of the tanker was illegally dumping the chemical waste in the drain which resulted in the gas leak. The driver fled. The labourers sleeping in nearby dyeing and printing factory and outside were affected. They fell unconscious following inhaling the leaked gas and were admitted in the New Civil Hospital in Surat. At least six people died and 22 people were hospitalised. Two stray dogs also died. The fire brigade sealed the tanker. The leaked chemical was identified as sodium hydrosulphite. The people from the area were evacuated as a precaution.

Investigation 
The initial investigation revealed that the chemical was purchased from Hikal Ltd, a pharma-chemical factory from Taloja in Maharashtra on pretext of selling it to another company and then was illegally dump in Surat by the accused. An FIR was also register against the managing director of the Hikal Ltd and other officials. Eleven people were arrested by state police.

The National Green Tribunal issued notice to the Gujarat Pollution Control Board.

See also 
Visakhapatnam gas leak
List of industrial disasters

References 

2022 disasters in India
2022 industrial disasters
Disasters in Gujarat
2020s in Gujarat
January 2022 events in India